FC Montana is a Bulgarian association football club based in Montana, which currently plays in the Second League, the second level of Bulgarian football league system.

Montana plays its home matches at the Ogosta Stadium, which has a capacity of 8,000 spectators. The club's traditional colours are blue, white and red. After a prolonged period of absence, they were propelled back into professional football in the mid 90s with the help of some experienced and talented footballers, including the ex-captain of English Aston Villa and Bulgarian international Stiliyan Petrov.

FC Montana was founded in 1921 when the few amateur sports clubs and organizations in the city decided to merge into one club. The new club was named SC Hristo Mihaylov after the Bulgarian communist party activist Hristo Popmihaylov, who was born in the town. Since then, Montana have spent a total of nine seasons in the Bulgarian First League and 43 seasons in the lower Second League. They have also reached the Bulgarian Cup final once, in 2016.

Honours
First League:
 9th place (2): 1995-96, 2015-16
Second League:
  Winners (2): 2008-09, 2014-15
Bulgarian Cup:
  Runners-up (1): 2015-16
Bulgarian League Cup:
  Runners-up (1): 1996

History

Early years (1921–1957)
PFC Montana was founded on 1921 under the name SC Hristo Mihaylov, after a union of a few sports clubs from the city. Until 1946, the most popular team was Botev 22. After 1944, many reforms in the club started. 
On 10 February 1946, Botev 22, along with Yunak and Spartak formed "Physical Culture Company YBS 45" (Yunak-Botev-Spartak 45).
On 20 March 1947 "YBC 45" was united with Workers Physical Culture Company "Avram Stoyanov", the turists branch "Pustrina" and the local horse-riding and moto-organisation, under the name of "Hristo Mihaylov".
During the autumn of 1949, a lot of changes occurred.
The city began to form voluntary sports organizations on a departmental basis, the most famous of which is Septemvri, which from 1953 played their first 3 seasons in the "B Group". 
In 1957 they were united in the SFS Septemvriyska Slava.

Settle in the professional football (1958–1992)
From 1957 to 1990 the sports club wore the name of Septemvriyska Slava. Montana gained a promotion for the second time in "B Group" in 1962, after which they finished in 3rd position, which remained their best ranking for the 60s and 80s, in which they almost always finished in the middle of the table. Since 1990, the club uses the name PFC Montana 1921.

Becoming a Bulgarian top-team (1993–1998)
During season 1994-1995 the team reached the Bulgaria first division " A group" for the first time, where they finished in 13th place and remaining in the division for 3 consecutive years. Montana reached the semi-final of the Bulgarian Cup. Montana's best season in the A PFG was in the 1995–96 season - 9th place. In this campaign, the team was led by Anatoli Tonov, Todor Pramatarov, Rumen Panayotov and Angel Chervenkov. The club reached the final of the currently folded Bulgarian League Cup tournament, but was knocked out by Neftochimic Burgas. Stiliyan Petrov was a key player for the team and was spotted by CSKA Sofia and sold in 1996, aged 17 years old. He enjoyed a successful stay there and was eventually bought by Celtic FC in 1999. Montana had to get a percent of the transfer, but the money never went to the club's cash register. In the 1996–97 season, Montana finished in the 15th place and was relegated to the second division. They defeated the champions CSKA Sofia with 3–1 in the last match. Otherwise according to the fans, Boyan Gergov is Montana's most prominent figure, being the club's top goalscorer with a total of 157 goals in 364 matches. 
The following 1997–1998 season, after a financial collapse, Montana was relegated to the Bulgarian V AFG.

Return to the top flight (2004-2011)
After a 7-year stay in the V AFG, the club finished in the 2nd position in the North-West V AFG, and Montana returned in the West B PFG for the 2004–05 season.
In 2008, the chairman of PFC Montana appointed Ivan Marinov as a manager of the club. The following year, with the financial support of the mayor of the city Zlatko Zhivkov, the club finished the season in the West B PFG in the first place and therefore Montana gained promotion to the top flight for the upcoming season. The same year, Montana's striker Ventsislav Ivanov became the top goalscorer of the division with the impressive 19 goals.

In season 2009–10 in the then "A" football group, Montana finished 11th and remained in the league for 4 consecutive seasons, before being relegated to the lower division on 15th place. They remained in the "B" group for 2 seasons before finishing 1st and being promoted to the first division.

First Bulgarian Cup Final, 100th anniversary (2015-)
Montana started the new 2015–16 season with a surprising 0–0 draw as a guest to a strong sided Beroe, then defeating with the impressive 6-0 Botev Plovdiv, with Ivan Minchev scoring a hattrick. The good matches continued as Montana finished 1–1 with the champion Ludogorets Razgrad. The same season Montana would go all the way to the Bulgarian Cup final, before losing 1–0 to CSKA Sofia in a match with above 33,300 attendance. However, Montana would later finish 9th in the "A" group and successfully defend its place in the relegation playoffs for the next season in the renamed "First Legue". The season didn't go well for Montana as they finished 13th and lost the relegation playoff against Septemvri Sofia in a close 2-1 match. In season 2018-2019 Montana finished second and once again played in a promotion playoff against FC Vitosha Bistritsa, in which lost with 3–0.

However, in the next season, after 3 years of awaiting for promotion, Montana finished third in the 2019-20 season in the second tier, qualifying for playoffs. On 17 July, Montana defeated Dunav Ruse 4–1, and was finally promoted to the First League after the long wait. The team started the new season in the first tier with a 3–3 draw against Arda Kardzhali, then drew 0–0 with FC Tsarsko Selo away, before finally getting a 1–0 triumph against Etar Veliko Tarnovo.

Past seasons

Recent seasons

League positions

10 seasons in A Group
45 seasons in B Group

Stadium

FC Montana's home ground is the Ogosta Stadium in Montana. The stadium was built in 1965, but the ground underwent a total reconstruction after 41 years, in 2006. It has approximately 8,000 seats, spread in two opposite stands, with pitch dimensions of 105×68 metres. The record attendance at the stadium is 11,500 spectators and it was achieved at a game between CSKA Sofia and Montana. The stadium's name is derived from the river Ogosta, which passes through the town.

Supporters and rivalries
One of the club's ultras group is known as Ogosta Boys.

Montana's rival is the neighbouring city club of Botev Vratsa, and both form the local "Northwestern Derby".

Players

Current squad
 

For recent transfers, see Transfers summer 2022.

Out on loan

Foreign players
Up to five non-EU nationals can be registered and given a squad number for the first team in the Bulgarian First League however only three can be used during a match day. Those non-EU nationals with European ancestry can claim citizenship from the nation their ancestors came from. If a player does not have European ancestry he can claim Bulgarian citizenship after playing in Bulgaria for 5 years.

EU Nationals

EU Nationals (Dual citizenship)
  Foudil Idriss
  Mehdi Ouamri

Non-EU Nationals

Club officials

Board of directors

Current technical body

Former managers
  Atanas Dzhambazki (2007)
  Rumen Stoyanov (July 2007–Sept 07)
  Stevica Kuzmanovski (July 2009–Dec 09)
  Atanas Dzhambazki (Jan 2010–June 11)
  Ivan Marinov
  Stefan Grozdanov (July 2011–Dec 11)
  Atanas Atanasov (Dec 2011–??)
  Atanas Dzhambazki (July 2012–??)
  Stoycho Stoev (Feb 2013–Apr 2013)
  Georgi Stankov
  Atanas Dzhambazki (June 2013–Dec 2013)
  Nikolay Mitov (Dec 2013–May 2014)
  Ferario Spasov (May 2014–Nov 2015)
  Emil Velev (Nov 2015–May 2016)
  Stevica Kuzmanovski (June 2016–Oct 2016)
  Atanas Dzhambazki (Oct 2016–Apr 2017)
  Atanas Atanasov (Apr 2017–Jun 2017)
  Yavor Valchinov (Jun 2017–Aug 2017)
  Ferario Spasov (Aug 2017–Mar 2019)
  Stefan Genov (Mar 2019–Apr 2019)
  Atanas Atanasov (Apr 2019–Jun 2019)
  Nikola Spasov (April 2020–November 2020)
  Atanas Atanasov (December 2020–May 2021)
  Svetlan Kondev (May 2021–December 2021)
  Antoni Zdravkov (December 2021–September 2022)
  Ferario Spasov (September 2022–February 2023)
  Angel Stoykov (March 2023–)

Biggest wins in А Group (Domestic First League)
 6:0 Botev Plovdiv 25.07.2015
 5:2 Dunav Ruse 26.10.1996 - Away
 4:0 Lokomotiv Plovdiv 16.03.1996 - Away
 4:0 Etar Veliko Tarnovo 06.05.1995
 4:0 Litex Lovech 10.06.1995
 4:0 Cherno More Varna 23.10.2010
 4:1 Dunav Ruse 17.07.2020 – Away
 4:2 Lokomotiv Plovdiv 15.04.2010 - Away
 4:2 Botev Vratsa 10.09.2011 - Away
 3:0 Lokomotiv Gorna Oryahovitsa 29.05.2017 - Away
 3:0 Dunav Ruse 26.04.1997
 3:0 Pirin Blagoevgrad 19.11.1994
 3:0 Pirin Blagoevgrad 28.08.2010
 3:0 Pirin Gotse Delchev 06.10.2012
 3:1 CSKA Sofia 31.05.1997
 3:1 Botev Plovdiv 18.09.2020
 3:2 Cherno More Varna 10.05.2016
 3:2 Litex Lovech 06.04.1996

References

External links
 Official website

Montana
Montana, Bulgaria
Association football clubs established in 1921
1921 establishments in Bulgaria